In enzymology, a vitexin 2"-O-rhamnoside 7-O-methyltransferase is an enzyme that catalyzes the chemical reaction

S-adenosyl-L-methionine + vitexin 2"-O-beta-L-rhamnoside  S-adenosyl-L-homocysteine + 7-O-methylvitexin 2"-O-beta-L-rhamnoside

Thus, the two substrates of this enzyme are S-adenosyl methionine and vitexin 2"-O-beta-L-rhamnoside, whereas its two products are S-adenosylhomocysteine and 7-O-methylvitexin 2"-O-beta-L-rhamnoside.

This enzyme belongs to the family of transferases, specifically those transferring one-carbon group methyltransferases.  The systematic name of this enzyme class is S-adenosyl-L-methionine:vitexin-2"-O-beta-L-rhamnoside 7-O-methyltransferase.

References 

 

EC 2.1.1
Enzymes of unknown structure
O-methylated flavones metabolism